The Shenyang J-11 (Chinese: 歼-11; NATO reporting name Flanker-B, -L) is a twin-engine jet fighter of the People's Republic of China whose airframe is derived from the Soviet-designed Sukhoi Su-27. It is manufactured by the Shenyang Aircraft Corporation (SAC). The aircraft is operated by the People's Liberation Army Air Force (PLAAF) and the People's Liberation Army Naval Air Force (PLANAF).

Development

Proposed J-11
In the 1970s, the PLAAF initiated a project to develop a replacement for its MiG-19s. The 
Shenyang Aircraft Factory proposal, designated J-11, was a new light fighter powered by the British Rolls-Royce Spey 512 engine, with better maneuverability than the MiG-19 and better climb rate than the MiG-21. The project was abandoned due to difficulties in obtaining the engines.

Background: purchase of the Su-27
China is the first foreign operator of the Su-27 and the only country to acquire the fighter before the Fall of the Soviet Union. The deal, known as the '906 Project' in China, marked the leap in Chinese aviation capability in the 1990s. Discussion of the aircraft purchase began in 1988 when the Soviet Union offered China fourth-generation fighters like the MiG-29. However, the Chinese negotiator insisted on purchasing the Su-27, the most sophisticated fighter Soviets had at the time. The sales were approved in December 1990, with three fighters delivered to China before the disintegration of the Soviet Union in 1991. Russia completed the Su-27 order and later allowed China to assemble and manufacture the Su-27 domestically. The domestically built ones were designated as the "J-11".

The earliest batch of Su-27s were stationed at Wuhu air base in the early 1990s. In the next two decades, 78 Flankers were delivered under three separate contracts by the Russian KnAAPO and IAPO plants. Delivery of the aircraft began in February 1991 and finished by September 2009. The first contract was for 20 Su-27SK and 4 Su-27UBK aircraft. In February 1991, an Su-27 performed a flight demonstration at Beijing's Nanyuan Airport. Chinese Su-27 pilots described its performance as "outstanding" in all aspects and flight envelopes. The official induction to service with the PLAAF occurred shortly thereafter. China found some of the delivered Su-27UBKs are "second-handed", consequently Russia delivered 2 more Su-27UBKs to China as a compensation. 

Differences in the payment method delayed the signing of the second, identical contract. For the first batch, 70% of the payment had been made in barter transactions with light industrial goods and food. Russian Federation argued that future transactions should be made in US dollars. In May 1995, Chinese Central Military Commission Vice Chairman Liu Huaqing visited Russia and agreed to the term, on the condition that the production line of Su-27 is imported. The contract was signed the same year. Delivery of the final aircraft from the second batch, which consists of 16 Su-27SKs and 8 Su-27UBKs occurred in July 1996. In preparation for the expanding Su-27 fleet, the PLAAF sought to augment its trainer fleet.

On 3 December 1999, a third contract was signed, this time for 28 Su-27UBKs. All 76 of the aircraft featured strengthened airframe and landing gear – the result of the PLAAF demands air-ground capability. As a result, the aircraft is capable of employing most of the conventional Air-to-Ground ordnance produced by Russia. As is common for Russian export fighters, the active jamming device was downgraded; the Su-27's L005 ECM pod was replaced with the L203/L204 pod. Furthermore, there were slight avionics differences between the batches. The first batch had N001E radar, while the later aircraft had N001P radar, capable of engaging two targets at the same time. Additionally, ground radar and navigational systems were upgraded. The aircraft are not capable of deploying the R-77 (AA-12 "Adder") missile due to a downgraded fire control system, except for the last batch of 28 Su-27UBKs.

J-11
By the agreement, Shenyang Aircraft Corporation (SAC) would assemble aircraft from kits manufactured by Komsomolsk-on-Amur Aircraft Plant (KnAPPO), and fit them with Russian subsystems (avionics, radars and engines) which would not be coproduced. Production began in 1997. The first two were poorly assembled and required Russian assistance to rebuild. Five were built by 2000, and another 20 by 2003, by which time production was of high quality and incorporated local airframe parts; Russia did not object to local airframe parts, which allowed KnAPPO to reduce the contents of the kits supplied. By late 2004, KnAPPO delivered 105 kits, and 95 J-11s were delivered to the PLAAF.

By 2015, J-11s were upgraded with Chinese-made missile approach warning systems (MAWS). Unconfirmed upgrades included improved cockpit displays, and fire control systems for R-77 or PL-10 missiles.

Coproduction of the Su-27s reportedly ended in 2004 because China was developing the J-11B - a variant with domestic subsystems - in violation of the coproduction agreement. At the time, Russia refused to comment on the manufacturing of J-11B. At MAKS 2009, Rosoboronexport's General Manager Anatoli Isaykin said Russia and Sukhoi would "investigate the J-11B, as a Chinese copy of the Su-27". At the 2009 Farnborough Airshow, Alexander Fomin, Deputy Director of Russia's Federal Service for Military-Technical Co-operation, reported that Russia had not asked China about the "copying" of military equipment and that China had licenses to manufacture the aircraft and its components, including an agreement on the production of intellectual property (IP) rights. He also confirmed the existence of an all-encompassing contract and an ongoing licensed production of the Su-27 variant by the Chinese. This previously undisclosed IP agreement fuelled speculation about secret contracts or clauses in the original contract. The licence does not officially include carrier-capable aircraft (eg. Sukhoi Su-33) or variants (eg. Shenyang J-15).

J-11B
The J-11B "Flaming Dragon" is a multirole variant of the J-11 incorporating Chinese subsystems. It was conceived as a way to remove the J-11's dependency on Russia. SAC unveiled a J-11B mockup in mid-2002. Three prototypes were delivered to the PLAAF for testing in 2006. The two-seater J-11BS followed two years after the J-11B. By 2011, reportedly 90% of the J-11B was based on subsystems and parts designed in China, with the engine presumably being a major part of the remainder. Many domestic subsystems are improvements of those found on the Su-27SK.

Chinese subsystems on the J-11B include Type 1474 radar, 3-axis data system, power supply system, emergency power unit, brake system, hydraulic system, fuel system, environment control system, molecular sieve oxygen generation systems, digital flight control system, and glass cockpit. The airframe is slightly lighter due to greater use of composites.

The J-11B may carry the PL-12 and PL-15 air-to-air missiles

Engine replacement
By 2004, the J-11 was being tested with the Shenyang WS-10. Testing may have started as early as 2002; an image from the 2002 China International Aviation & Aerospace Exhibition allegedly depicted a J-11 with one engine replaced with a WS-10. WS-10 development proved difficult. One regiment converted to WS-10-powered J-11Bs in 2007, but was grounded for an extended period due to poor operational reliability. The WS-10A reportedly matured enough after 2009 to power the J-11B Block 02 aircraft, and Jane's reported the J-11B as powered by the WS-10 in 2014.

Operational history
In March 2011 a joint Sino-Pakistani exercise, Shaheen 1, was conducted at a Pakistan Air Force (PAF) base involving a contingent of Chinese aircraft and personnel from the PLAAF. Information on which aircraft were used by each side in the exercise was not released, but photos of Pakistani pilots inspecting what appeared to be Chinese Shenyang J-11B fighters were released on the internet. The exercise lasted for around 4 weeks and was the first time the PLAAF had deployed to and conducted "operational" aerial maneuvers in Pakistan with the PAF.

P-8 interception 

On 19 August 2014 a J-11B intercepted a U.S. Navy P-8 Poseidon anti-submarine warfare aircraft that was over the South China Sea.

The U.S. Department of Defense released details at a press conference on 22 August 2014 with Admiral John Kirby as spokesperson. The Chinese jet "crossed under the aircraft with one pass having only 50–100 feet [] separation. The Chinese jet also passed the nose of the P-8 at 90 degrees with its belly toward the P-8 Poseidon, believed to be displaying its weapons load-out. Afterwards, the J-11 flew directly under and alongside the P-8, bringing their wingtips, as I said, to within 20 feet []. And then conducted a roll over the P-8, passing within 45 feet []." He said the "unprofessional" and "unsafe" actions of the Chinese pilot was "not keeping with the kind of military-to-military relationship" the U.S. sought to establish with China. An official complaint was sent to China through regular diplomatic channels. The Pentagon commented further that: "Military activities may be conducted within the Exclusive Economic Zone of another nation as an exercise of the freedoms of navigation and overflight."

In response, the Chinese Ministry of National Defense spokesman Yang Yujun said that the U.S. criticisms were "totally groundless" as the Chinese pilot professionally maintained a safe distance. Furthermore, he blamed the "massive and frequent close-in surveillance" by the U.S. as the root cause, and called for the end of surveillance flights to improve bilateral military ties.

Variants
 J-11A (or J-11 with NATO reporting name Flanker-B) – Chinese/Russian assembled Su-27SK from Russian-made kits. 104 were built.
 J-11B (Flanker-L) – Chinese-developed variant with domestic subsystems. Block 02 powered by Shenyang WS-10 turbofan.
J-11BS (Flanker-L+) – A twin-seat version of the J-11B. In 2012, the number of J-11B and J-11BS in service was over 120.
 J-11BH (Flanker-L) – Naval version of the J-11B. It was first sighted in May 2010.
 J-11BSH (Flanker-L+) – Naval version of the J-11BS.
 J-11BG – Upgraded variant with light-grey radome; speculated to be equipped with AESA radar.
 J-11D (Flanker-L) – Variant possibly equipped with fixed electronically scanned array radar, IRST, and capability to fire heavier imaging/infrared (IIR) air-to-air missiles. The airframe makes greater use of composite materials, especially in the engine intakes for lower radar observability. The wings have three hardpoints each. Unconfirmed reports claim it has a new fly-by-wire control system, glass cockpit, improved EW systems, and an improved version of the WS-10A engine.

Operators

People's Liberation Army Air Force: 100 J-11A, 180 J-11B and 90 J-11BS
 1st Fighter Aviation Division
 6th Fighter Division
 7th Fighter Division

People's Liberation Army Naval Air Force: 40 J-11BH and 32 J-11BSH
 Naval Aeronautics University Regiment
 22nd Air Regiment
 24th Air Regiment
 25th Air Regiment

Specifications (J-11A/J-11)

See also

References
Citations

Bibliography

External links

J-11 fighter, Chinese PLAAF
A Flanker by any other name by Bai Wei Air Forces Monthly, May 2012

J-11, Shenyang
Shenyang aircraft
Twinjets
Fourth-generation jet fighter
Aircraft first flown in 1998
Twin-tail aircraft